Carew was the name of an electoral ward in Pembrokeshire, Wales. It was also coterminous with the boundaries of the community of Carew.

A ward of Pembrokeshire County Council since 1995 it was previously a ward of the former South Pembrokeshire District Council.

Following the recommendations of a boundary review by the Local Government Boundary Commission for Wales, effective from the 2022 local elections, the Carew ward was merged with the neighbouring community of Jeffreyston to create a new ward of 'Carew and Jeffreyston'.

Election results

2012
In 2012, Neale was returned unopposed.

2008
Neale retained the seat in 2008.

2004
At the third election, in 2004 Norman Parry was defeated, finishing last in a four-cornered contest.

1999
At the second election, in 1999 the Conservative Party fielded candidates in Pembrokeshire for the first time but they were defeated in Carew.

1995
At the first election for the new Pembrokeshire County Council in 1995, an Independent, previously a member of South Pembrokeshire District Council was elected.

References

Former electoral wards of Pembrokeshire